Herrings Green is a hamlet in the civil parish of Cotton End, on the outskirts of Bedford, in the Bedford district, in the ceremonial county of Bedfordshire, England.
The settlement is close to Cotton End and Wilstead. It is a tiny group of just 3 cottages and some farms on the Wilstead Road. Until 2019 Herrings Green forms part of the Eastcotts civil parish.

Hamlets in Bedfordshire
Borough of Bedford